IFMA may refer to:
 Institut Français de Mécanique Avancée
 International Facility Management Association
 International Federation of Muaythai Amateur
 International Foodservice Manufacturers Association
 Intreprinderea de Fabricat şi Montaj Ascensoare (Romania)